A Man Betrayed may refer to:

 A Man Betrayed (1936 film), directed by John H. Auer and starring Edward J. Nugent and Kay Hughes
 A Man Betrayed (1941 film), directed by John H. Auer and starring John Wayne and Frances Dee